Tarah Korir ( McKay, born 1 May 1987) is a Canadian long-distance runner. She competed in the women's marathon at the 2017 World Championships in Athletics.

References

External links
 
 

1987 births
Living people
Canadian female long-distance runners
Canadian female marathon runners
World Athletics Championships athletes for Canada
Place of birth missing (living people)